Olearia curticoma is a species of flowering plant in the family Asteraceae and is endemic to Victoria. It is an erect shrub with glabrous, sticky branchlets, linear leaves and white and yellow, daisy-like inflorescences.

Description
Flowering occurs from December to May and the fruit is a cylindrical achene, the pappus short and white.

Taxonomy and naming
Olearia curticoma was first formally described in 2014 by Neville Grant Walsh in the journal Muelleria from specimens he collected in the Mitchell River National Park.

Distribution and habitat
This daisy bush grows in dry forest and is only known from a small population above the Mitchell River at the type location in eastern Victoria.

Conservation status
Olearia curticoma is listed as "critically endangered" under the Victorian Government Flora and Fauna Guarantee Act 1988.

References

curticoma
Flora of Victoria (Australia)
Plants described in 2014
Taxa named by Neville Grant Walsh